Timothy Ferriss (born July 20, 1977) is an American entrepreneur, investor, author, podcaster, and lifestyle guru. He became well-known through his 4-Hour self-help book series—including The 4-Hour Work Week, The 4-Hour Body, and The 4-Hour Chef—that focused on lifestyle optimizations, but he has since reconsidered this approach.

Early life
Ferriss grew up in East Hampton, New York. Throughout childhood, Ferriss experienced poor health, sparking an interest in self-improvement. After graduating from St. Paul's School, Ferriss matriculated at Princeton University, earning a B.A. in East Asian studies in 2000. His senior thesis was titled Acquisition of Japanese Kanji: Conventional Practice and Mnemonic Supplementation, under the supervision of Seiichi Makino. After graduating from Princeton, Ferriss worked in sales at a data storage company.

Career
In 2001, Ferriss founded BrainQUICKEN, an internet-based nutritional supplements business, while still employed at his prior job. He sold the company, then known as BodyQUICK, to a London-based private equity firm in 2010. He has stated that The 4-Hour Workweek was based on this period.

Ferriss has been an angel investor and advisor to startups. He invested or advised in companies including as Reputation.com, Trippy, and TaskRabbit. He is a pre-seed money advisor to Uber. In 2013, Ferriss raised $250,000 to invest in Shyp by forming a syndicate on AngelList. Ferriss raised over $500,000 through his backers, and Shyp raised a total of $2.1 million. In 2018, Shyp shut down and laid off all its employees.

In November 2013, Ferriss began an audiobook publishing venture, Tim Ferriss Publishing. The first book published was Vagabonding by Rolf Potts. Other books include Ego is the Enemy and The Obstacle Is The Way by Ryan Holiday, Daily Rituals by Mason Currey, and What I Learned Losing A Million Dollars by Jim Paul and Brendan Moynihan.

Also in 2015, Ferriss declared a long vacation from new investing. He cited the stress of the work and a feeling his impact was "minimal in the long run", and said he planned to spend time on his writing and media projects. In 2017 he stated one of the reasons he moved from Silicon Valley was that, "After effectively 'retiring' from angel investing 2 years ago," he had no professional need to be in the Bay Area.

Ferriss has written five books, The 4-Hour Workweek (2007, expanded edition 2009), The 4-Hour Body (2010), The 4-Hour Chef (2012), Tools of Titans (2016), and Tribe of Mentors (2017).

In December 2013, The Tim Ferriss Experiment debuted on HLN. The series focused on Ferriss' life hacking and speed learning methods. Although 13 episodes were produced, only a portion were shown on television. Ferriss also hosted the 2017 TV show Fear{Less} with Tim Ferriss, in which he interviews people from different industries about success and innovation.

Ferriss has raised funds for the Center for Psychedelic and Consciousness Research at Johns Hopkins University School of Medicine and for the Center for Psychedelic Research at Imperial College London. Since 2016, Ferriss donated at least $2,000,000 for clinical research into psychedelic drugs.

In 2017, Tim Ferriss gave the TED talk "Why you should define your fears instead of your goals."

In 2019, Forbes called Tim's "4-Hour" advice "everything that's wrong with the modern world" because it contributes to the idea that people's success is about "[figuring] out how to most attractively package their shortcuts and fake-outs" more than actual accomplishment.

He reevaluated his earlier ideas in a 2020 interview with GQ, concluding that "not everything that is meaningful can be measured."

Ferriss continues to release episodes of The Tim Ferriss Show, an interview-centered podcast running since April 22, 2014.

In December 2022 he launches an NFT project about roosters named "The Legend of CockPunch".

Published works

References

External links

 
 Podcast

1977 births
American male bloggers
American bloggers
American business theorists
American business writers
American Internet celebrities
American motivational writers
American podcasters
Angel investors
Diet food advocates
Life coaches
Living people
People from East Hampton (town), New York
Princeton University alumni
Technology evangelists
Henry Crown Fellows
21st-century American non-fiction writers
21st-century American male writers
American male non-fiction writers
Writers from New York (state)